Javed Khan (c. 1695 – 1752) was an Irani daroga (head of police) under the emperor Muhammad Shah (1722–1748), and as effective regent during the reign of Muhammad's weak successor, Ahmad Shah, from (1748-1752), during the period of final decline of the Mughal Empire.

In 1722, Javed Khan was a "handsome eunuch of youthful age and robust personality" as he was made chief eunuch of the royal household. Upon the accession of Ahmad Shah Bahadur. In 1748, Javed Khan was  conferred the title of Nawab Bahadur by the Emperor, on the insistence of his mother, Udham Bai. Due to the weak leadership of the emperor, he acted as effective regent and  took the leadership of the so-called "court party", pitted against Nawab Wazir, Safdar Jung. He was the paramour of Udham Bai, mother of Ahmad shah.

In 1752, he was killed by Safdar Jang, which resulted in his falling out of favour with the Emperor's mother, and consequently the latter's attempts to reassert control resulted in a full blown civil war between the Irani and Turani parties of the Empire.

References
Jaswant Lal Mehta, "Fragmentation of the Mughal Empire (1707-60)",  Advanced Study in the History of Modern India 1707-1813, 2005, 133-136.

Mughal nobility
1690s births
1752 deaths